3 Seasons in Hell is a 2009 Czech film directed by Tomáš Mašín. Set during the Soviet Union's takeover of Czechoslovakia in 1948, it is based on memoirs by Egon Bondy.

Response
Ray Bennett praised the performances of Krystof Hadek and Karolina Gruszka, saying that although initially shallow and inconsequential the viewer came to feel deeply involved in them. Variety praised the cinematography and production design while finding the lead character annoying and unsympathetic. What Culture found it balanced and interesting despite flaws, giving it 3/5.

References

External links
 
 

2009 films
2009 drama films
2000s Czech-language films
Czech Lion Awards winners (films)
Czech drama films
2000s Czech films